Trustly Group is a Swedish fintech company founded in 2008. Trustly is an open banking payment method that allows customers to shop and pay from their online bank account, without the use of a card or app. Its account-to-account network supports 6,300 banks, reaching 525 million consumers and bypassing the card networks.

Trustly provides its service to PayPal and TransferWise, among other companies.

Trustly is used by more than 8,000 merchants including PayPal, Alibaba, Facebook, eBay, AT&T, Unicef, Dell, Lyft, GoFundMe, TransferWise, DraftKings, and eToro. In 2020, Trustly launched in Australia and Canada, adding to its existing coverage in Europe and the US. Trustly generated revenue in 2019, totaling $150 million, up 58% from 2018. In 2020, Trustly had sales of approximately SEK 1.9 billion. In 2020, Trustly established itself in Australia and Canada and is currently present in a total of 30 markets.

History 
The company, originally named Glue Finance, was founded in 2008 in Stockholm, Sweden, and signed contracts that same year with the first online retailers. A first investment round was completed in 2009, and development of a second generation technical platform was launched. The company underwent a geographical expansion in 2010, after which its revenues grew by more than 200%. The first office outside of Sweden was opened in Malta and over one million transactions were processed the same year. The second generation platform was launched in 2011, and 25% of the company was sold to the investment group Alfvén & Didrikson.

In 2014, the company entered into a strategic partnership with Groupon  as well as PayPal. The 10 million transactions mark was reached and the risk capital firm Bridgepoint Capital (BDC) invested €23 million to gain a minority stake.

The arrival of Pay N Play epitomises Trustly’s mission to make online payments fast, simple and secure, transforming the way gamblers pay and play at online gambling from 2016. More than 150 brands support payments with Pay N Play. According to Trustly's VP of Gaming Vasilije Lekovic, this number passed 200 brands in 2022.

The Swedish FinTech company ranked #242 on the publication's first ‘FT 1000: Europe’s Fastest Growing Companies’ list in 2017 based on its 3-year growth in revenue and staff.

In March 2018, the private equity fund Nordic Capital bought a majority stake, some 70 percent of the existing shares, in Trustly. Ahead of the deal the company reportedly got valued at roughly €700 million.

In June 2019, Trustly merged with Silicon Valley-based online banking payments leader PayWithMyBank. The merger enables merchants with a global footprint to accept online banking payments from European and US consumers.

On June 10, 2020, Trustly announced a new round of investment from a consortium of investors, including BlackRock, which valued the company at close to $2 billion.

In August 2020, Trustly expanded into Canada and Australia, marking its first step into the Asia-Pacific region.

In April 2021, Trustly signalled their intention to list publicly on Nasdaq, Stockholm, seeking a valuation of almost $9bn.

Security 
Trustly is a licensed payment institution authorized and supervised by the Swedish Financial Supervisory Authority. It holds a European Payment Services Provider (PSP) license in accordance with the Payment Services Directive (PSD, 2007/64/EC).

A Trustly payment uses strong two-factor authentication.

Criticism 
Trustly faced criticism in 2013 from a competing bank when they used client information to log into the client's Internet banking. The bank claimed that Trustly had gained access not only to the information required for performing the payment but also to information related to, for example, the client's mutual funds and shareholdings and therefore, banking confidentiality had been compromised. The controversy has resurfaced in 2016, in Poland when PayPal switched to Trustly and a number of information security related websites and banks pointed out that the Trustly's practice is inconsistent with PayPal's own guidance to avoid revealing the credentials to third parties. In 2018, Finnish Financial Supervisory Authority ruled that the screen scraping technique used by Trustly is illegal.

Trustly defended itself by saying that the company sets out a clear agreement for what information the company may access for performing payments and establishing identity, in the same way as banks. Like the banks, Trustly is under the supervision of the Swedish Financial Supervisory Authority as a licensed Payment Institute.

References 

Financial services companies of Sweden
Software companies of Sweden
Companies based in Stockholm